Gustavo Antonio Miguel Ortega Joaquín (born 29 September 1966) is a Mexican politician from the National Action Party. From 2009 to 2012 he served as Deputy of the LXI Legislature of the Mexican Congress representing Quintana Roo.

References

1966 births
Living people
Politicians from Yucatán (state)
People from Mérida, Yucatán
National Action Party (Mexico) politicians
21st-century Mexican politicians
Deputies of the LXI Legislature of Mexico
Members of the Chamber of Deputies (Mexico) for Quintana Roo